Xavier Ros Oton (Barcelona, 1988) is a Spanish mathematician who works on partial differential equations (PDEs).
He is an ICREA Research Professor and a Full Professor at the University of Barcelona.

Research
His research is mainly focused on topics related to the regularity of solutions to nonlinear elliptic and parabolic PDE.
Some of his main contributions have been in the context of free boundary problems, integro-differential equations, and the Calculus of Variations.

Career
He earned his Bachelor's and Master's degree at the Universitat Politècnica de Catalunya in 2010 and 2011, and completed his PhD in 2014 under the supervision of Xavier Cabré.
He then moved to the University of Texas at Austin, where he was an R. H. Bing Instructor, and worked with Alessio Figalli and Luis Caffarelli.
After that, he was an assistant professor at the University of Zurich. Since 2020, Ros-Oton is an ICREA Research Professor at the University of Barcelona.

He is a member of the editorial board of scientific journals, including Calculus of Variations and Partial Differential Equations and Collectanea Mathematica.

Honors and awards

In 2017, he received both the Rubio de Francia Prize from the Royal Spanish Mathematical Society and the Antonio Valle Prize from the Spanish Society of Applied Mathematics.
In 2018, he was the youngest PI of an ERC Starting Grant.
Then, in 2019, he received the Scientific Research Award from the Fundacion Princesa de Girona.

In 2021 he was awarded the Stampacchia Gold Medal in recognition of outstanding contributions to the field of Calculus of Variations.

Selected publications
Figalli, A.; Ros-Oton, X.; Serra, J. (2021). The singular set in the Stefan problem. preprint arXiv:2103.13379.
Figalli, A.; Ros-Oton, X.; Serra, J. (2020). Generic regularity of free boundaries for the obstacle problem. Publ. Math. Inst. Hautes Études Sci. 132, 181-292.
Cabré, X.; Figalli, A.; Ros-Oton, X.; Serra, J. (2020). Stable solutions to semilinear elliptic equations are smooth up to dimension 9. Acta Math. 224, 187-252.
Barrios, B.; Figalli, A.; Ros-Oton, X.; (2018). Free boundary regularity in the parabolic fractional obstacle problem. Comm. Pure Appl. Math. 71, 2129-2159.
Caffarelli, L.; Ros-Oton, X.; Serra, J. (2017). Obstacle problems for integro-differential operators: regularity of solutions and free boundaries. Invent. Math. 208, 1155-1211.
Ros-Oton, X.; Serra, J. (2016). Boundary regularity for fully nonlinear integro-differential equations. Duke Math. J. 165, 2079-2154.

References

External links 

 Xavier Ros-Oton at the University of Barcelona
 Xavier Ros-Oton at Google Scholar
 Xavier Ros-Oton at ICREA Community
 Xavier Ros-Oton at ORCID Community

1988 births
Living people
European Research Council grantees
21st-century Spanish mathematicians
Scientists from Barcelona
Polytechnic University of Catalonia alumni